The Ottawa micropolitan area may refer to:

The Ottawa, Illinois micropolitan area, United States
The Ottawa, Kansas micropolitan area, United States

See also
Ottawa metropolitan area
Ottawa (disambiguation)